Viktor Úradník (born 11 August 2004) is a Slovak professional footballer who plays for Ružomberok of the Fortuna Liga as a midfielder.

Club career

MFK Ružomberok
Úradník made his Fortuna Liga debut for Ružomberok against Spartak Trnava at Anton Malatinský Stadium on 24 April 2022, replacing Martin Boďa.

References

External links
 MFK Ružomberok official club profile 
 Futbalnet profile 
 
 

2004 births
Living people
Sportspeople from Banská Bystrica
Slovak footballers
Association football midfielders
MFK Ružomberok players
Slovak Super Liga players